Gábor Harsányi (born 15 June 1945) is a Hungarian actor.

In 2009, he was chosen the "Outstanding Lead Actor" at the Midtown International Theatre Festival in New York.

Roles 
Kabarémúzeum (2006) – film
South Park (2000–present) as Chef (Séf bácsi) – voice
Rocko's Modern Life (1997) (Rocko) as Heffer Wolfe (Melák) – voice
Animaniacs (1993–1998) as Dr. Otto Scratchansniff (Dr. Otto Agyalágy) – voice
The Falcons (1970)

References 

Other sources

External links 
 
 Színház.hu
 

1945 births
Living people
Hungarian male film actors
Hungarian male voice actors